The 2016 European Junior & U23 Weightlifting Championships were held in Eilat, Israel from 2 December to 10 December 2016.

Medal overview (juniors)

Men

Women

Medals table

U23
Page 101 and 103 of source:

Medals table

Overall medals table

References

External links
European U23 Championships results 
 https://ewf.sport/wp-content/uploads/2022/03/Junior-U23-Europe-Championsjips-Eilat-ISR-4-10-december-2016-ResultsBook.pdf

European Junior & U23 Weightlifting Championships
International weightlifting competitions hosted by Israel
2016 in Israeli sport
2016 in weightlifting